Chip 'n Dale: Rescue Rangers may refer to:
Chip 'n Dale: Rescue Rangers (TV series), 1989 television series
Chip 'n Dale: Rescue Rangers (film), 2022 film
Chip 'n Dale Rescue Rangers (video game), 1990 game based on the TV series
Chip 'n Dale Rescue Rangers 2, 1993 sequel to the 1990 game
Chip 'n Dale Rescue Rangers: The Adventures in Nimnul's Castle, 1990 computer game